An anime television series based on the light novel Horizon in the Middle of Nowhere was announced in the March 2011 issue of Dengeki Bunko Magazine. Produced by Sunrise, the anime series debuted in Japan on October 1, 2011. The series has been licensed by Sentai Filmworks in North America and was simulcasted through the Anime Network on October 4, 2011, followed by a home video release in 2012. Sentai has also licensed the second season for streaming and home video release in 2013. The opening theme song for the first season is "TERMINATED" by Minori Chihara. The first ending theme used is "Pieces -Side Ariadust-" by AiRI and the second ending theme used is "Stardust Melodia -Side Horizon-" by Ceui. For the second season, the opening theme is "ZONE//ALONE" by Minori Chihara.

Episode list

First season

Second season

References 

Horizon in the Middle of Nowhere